Răciula is a commune in Călărași District, Moldova. It is composed of two villages, Parcani and Răciula.

References

Communes of Călărași District